VV ZOB, short for Voetbalvereniging Zuidoostbeemster, is a Dutch football club from  Zuidoostbeemster. Since 2019, VV ZOB plays in the Eerste Klasse Saturday.

History 
ZOB was founded on 1 July 1956. In 1969 it joined KNVB's Vierde Klasse. In 1976 and 1977, it won section championships bringing it to the Tweede Klasse, a climb of two leagues in two years. In the 1980s and 1990s ZOB hovered between the Tweede and Derde Klasse. This situation ended in 1996 when it promoted to the Tweede for the third time.

In 2000–01, ZOB played one season in the Eerste Klasse. From 2001 to 2019, it played 18 consecutive season in the Tweede Klasse. In 2019, ZOB won a title in the second tremster in the Tweede Klasse. Through the subsequent playoffs it returned to the Eerste Klasse.

Chief coaches 
Mohad Zaoudi (since 2015)

References 

Football clubs in the Netherlands
Football clubs in North Holland
Sport in Purmerend
1956 establishments in the Netherlands
Association football clubs established in 1956